Johannes Tammsoo (also Johannes Tamson; born 10 August 1910 in Tallinn) was an Estonian politician. He was a member of V Riigikogu.

References

1910 births
Year of death missing
Politicians from Tallinn
People from Kreis Harrien
Left-wing Workers politicians
Members of the Riigikogu, 1932–1934